The 322d Troop Carrier Squadron is an inactive United States Air Force unit. Its last assignment was with the Fifth Air Force, being inactivated at Kadena Air Base, Okinawa on 8 December 1957.

The squadron was originally activated by the Fourteenth Air Force at Kunming Airport, China to provide air transportation in that country. At the end of the war, it airlifted Chinese troops to bases in eastern China for disarmament operations. The squadron was reactivated on Okinawa in the 1950s as a special operations unit, replacing the 581st Air Resupply Group.

History

Lineage
 Constituted as the 322d Troop Carrier Squadron on 25 August 1944
 Activated on 9 September 1944
 Inactivated on 6 January 1946
 Redesignated the 322d Troop Carrier Squadron, Medium (Special) on 18 July 1956
 Activated on 18 September 1956
 Inactivated on 8 December 1957

Assignments
 Fourteenth Air Force, 9 September 1944
 Tenth Air Force, 25 August 1945 – 6 January 1946
 Attached to 443d Troop Carrier Group, 4 September-1 December 1945
 313th Air Division, 18 September 1956
 Fifth Air Force, 12 February-8 December 1957.

Stations
 Kunming Airport, China, 9 September 1944
 Loping Airfield, China, 25 May 1945
 Liangshan Airfield, China, 1 August 1945
 Chihkiang Airfield, China, 25 August 1945
 Hankow Airfield, China, 3 October-i December 1945
 Fort Lawton, Washington, 4–6 January 1946
 Kadena Air Base, Okinawa, 18 September 1956 – 8 December 1957.

Aircraft
 C-47 Skytrain, 1944–1945
 C-46 Commando, 1945
 C-54 Skymaster, 1956–1957
 SA-16 Albatross, 1956–1957
 C-119 Flying Boxcar, 1956–1957

References

External links

Troop carrier squadrons of the United States Air Force
Troop carrier squadrons of the United States Army Air Forces